John Watson Bell (6 October 1868 – 12 April 1956) was a Scottish football player and manager.

Career
A winger or inside-forward born in Dumbarton, Bell played with Dumbarton Union, Dumbarton, Everton, Tottenham Hotspur, Celtic, New Brighton Tower and Preston North End. During his time with Everton, he was one of a group of five men who were the first to be selected for Scotland while playing for an English club (although Bell had been capped already at Dumbarton), in the process becoming the club's first international for that nation. As well as playing for one season alongside his younger brother Laurie, previously also a Dumbarton teammate, he also helped organise the Association Footballers' Union and later served as its president; his activities in this area caused Everton to end his contract, and he switched to non-league Tottenham for a short period before returning to Scotland with Celtic, though he later returned to Goodison Park.

In 1909, Bell was appointed manager/coach of former club Preston. He later spent some time in Canada, but settled in the Merseyside area. His great-grandson Tom Smith was a Scottish international in rugby union.

International goals 

Scores and results list Scotland's goal tally first.

Honours
Dumbarton
 Scottish League: Champions 1890–91, 1891–92
 Scottish Cup: Runner-up 1890–91
 Dumbartonshire Cup: Winners 1888–89, 1889–90, 1890–91, 1891–92, 1892–93
 League Charity Cup: Winners 1890–91
 Greenock Charity Cup: Winners 1889–90 - Runner-up 1888–89
 2 caps for Scotland between 1889 and 1892, scoring one goal
 1 cap for the Scottish League in 1892, scoring one goal
 1 representative cap for Scotland against Canada XI in 1891, scoring two goals
 7 representative caps for Dumbartonshire between 1888 and 1890, scoring three goals
 2 international trial games for Scotland between 1890 and 1892
 top Scottish League goalscorer: 1890–91 (20 goals); 1891–92 (19 goals).

References

External links

London Hearts Profile - Scotland
London Hearts Profile - Scottish League

1868 births
Celtic F.C. players
Dumbarton F.C. players
Everton F.C. players
New Brighton Tower F.C. players
Sportspeople from Dumbarton
Footballers from West Dunbartonshire
Preston North End F.C. managers
Preston North End F.C. players
Scotland international footballers
Scottish Football League players
English Football League players
Scottish Football League representative players
Scottish football managers
Scottish footballers
1956 deaths
Scottish league football top scorers
Scottish expatriates in Canada
Association football outside forwards
Scottish sports executives and administrators
British trade union leaders
FA Cup Final players